Jānis is a Latvian masculine given name. The first written use of the name Jānis dates back to 1290. It may refer to:
Jānis Ādamsons (born 1956), Latvian politician
Jānis Akuraters (1876–1937), Latvian poet, writer, playwright and politician
Jānis Andersons (born 1986), Latvian ice hockey defenceman
Jānis Balodis (1881–1965), Latvian army general and politician
Jānis Frīdrihs Baumanis (1834–1891), Latvian architect
Jānis Bebris (1917–1969), Latvian footballer
Jānis Beinarovičs (1907–1967), Latvian wrestler
Jānis Bērziņš (1889–1938), Latvian and Soviet communist military official and politician
Jānis Bērziņš (born 1993), Latvian basketball player
Jānis Birks (born 1956), Latvian politician
Jānis Blūms (born 1982), Latvian professional basketball player
Jānis Bojārs (born 1956), Latvian shot putter
Jānis Brikmanis (1940–2019), Latvian zoologist, environmental conservationist, radio and television presenter, and writer
Jānis Buivids (1864–1937), Latvian military general
Jānis Bulis (born 1950), Latvian Roman Catholic bishop
Jānis Čakste (1859–1927), Latvian politician and lawyer, former President of Latvia
Jānis Cimze (1814–1881), Latvian pedagogue, collector and harmoniser of folk songs and organist
Jānis Čoke (1878–1910), Latvian revolutionary and bank robber
Jānis Daliņš (1904–1978), Latvian race walker and Olympic medalist
Jānis Dimza (1906–c.1942), decathlete and Olympic competitor
Jānis Doniņš (born 1946), Latvian javelin thrower
Jānis Dreimanis (born 1949), Latvian football manager football defender
Jānis Dūklavs (born 1952), Latvian politician
Jānis Dukšinskis (born 1963), Latvian politician
Jānis Eglītis (born 1961), Latvian politician
Jānis Endzelīns (1873–1961), Latvian linguist
Jānis Francis (1877–1956), Latvian army general
Jānis Gailītis (born 1985), Latvian basketball player and coach
Jānis Gilis (1943–2000), Latvian football manager
Jānis Ikaunieks (1912–1969), Latvian astronomer
Jānis Ikaunieks (born 1995), Latvian footballer
Jānis Ilsters (1851–1889), Latvian botanist, teacher and folklore collector
Jānis Ivanovs (1906–1983), Latvian classical music composer
Jānis Jaks (born 1995), Latvian ice hockey player
Jānis Jansons (born 1982), Latvian floorball player
Jānis Jaunsudrabiņš (1877—1962), Latvian writer and painter
Jānis Joņevs (born 1980), Latvian writer 
Jānis Judiņš (1884–1918), Latvian Riflemen commander and Red hero of the Russian Civil War
Jānis Jurkāns (born 1946), Latvian politician
Jānis Kalējs (born 1965), Latvian film director
Jānis Kalmīte (1907–1996), Latvian expressionist painter
Jānis Kalniņš (1904–2000), Latvian and Canadian composer
Jānis Karlivāns (born 1982), Latvian decathlete and Olympic competitor
Jānis Kaufmanis (born 1989), Latvian basketball player
Jānis Ķipurs (born 1958), Latvian bobsledder and Olympic medalist
Jānis Klovāns (1935–2010), Latvian chess Grandmaster
Jānis Krūmiņš (1930–1994), Latvian basketball player
Jānis Lagzdiņš (born 1952), Latvian politician
Jānis Leitis (born 1989), Latvian long jumper
Jānis Lidmanis (1910–1986), Latvian footballer and basketballer
Jānis Liepiņš (1894–1964), Latvian painter
Jānis Liepiņš (born 1988), Latvian conductor
Jānis Lipke (1900–1987), Latvian rescuer of Jews during World War II
Jānis Līvens (1884–????), was a Latvian cyclist and Olympic competitor
Jānis Lūsis (born 1939), Latvian javelin thrower and Olympic medalist
Jānis Matulis (1911–1985), Latvian prelate of the Evangelical Lutheran Church of Latvia and Archbishop of Riga
Jānis Medenis (1903–1961), Latvian poet and writer 
Jānis Mediņš (1890–1966), Latvian composer
Jānis Miglavs (born 1948), Latvian-born American photographer and writer
Jānis Miņins (born 1980), Latvian bobsledder
Jānis Paipals (born 1983), Latvian cross-country skier and Olympic competitor
Jānis Paukštello (born 1951), Latvian stage and film actor
Jānis Pauļuks (1865–1937), Latvian politician, former Prime Minister of Latvia
Jānis Pētersons (born  1998), Latvian singer (Citi Zēni)
Jānis Pīnups (1925–2007), Latvian partisan
Jānis Pliekšāns (aka Rainis) (1865–1929), Latvian poet, playwright, translator, and politician
Jānis Podžus (born 1994), Latvian tennis player
Jānis Polis (1938–2011), Latvian pharmacologist
Jānis Pujats (born 1930), Latvian Roman Catholic archbishop emeritus of Riga
Jānis Reinis (born 1960), Latvian stage and film actor
Jānis Rinkus (born 1977), Latvian footballer 
Janis Rozentāls (1866–1916), Latvian painter
Jānis Rozītis (1913–1942), Latvian football forward
Jānis Rudzītis (1903–1967), Latvian wrestler and Olympic competitor
Jānis Rudzutaks (1887–1938), Latvian Bolshevik revolutionary and Soviet politician
Janis Skroderis (born 1983), Latvian professional tennis player
Jānis Šmēdiņš (born 1987), Latvian beach volleyball player and Olympic competitor
Jānis Šmits (born 1968), Latvian politician
Jānis Sprukts (born 1982), Latvian professional ice hockey forward
Jānis Straume (born 1962), Latvian politician
Jānis Straupe (born 1989), Latvian ice hockey player
Jānis Streičs (born 1936), Latvian film director
Jānis Strēlnieks (born 1989), Latvian basketball player
Jānis Strupulis (born 1949), Latvian sculptor and graphic designer
Jānis Sudrabkalns (1894–1975), Latvian poet and writer
Jānis Tilbergs (1880–1972), Latvian painter and a sculptor
Jānis Timma (born 1992), Latvian basketball player 
Jānis Tutins (born 1966), Latvian politician
Jānis Urbanovičs (born 1959), Latvian politician
Jānis Vanags (born 1958), archbishop of the Evangelical Lutheran Church of Latvia
Jānis Vilsons (born 1944), Latvian handball player and Olympic competitor
Jānis Vinters (born 1971), Latvian rally racing motorcycle rider
Jānis Vītols (1911–1993), Latvian cyclist and Olympic competitor
Jānis Vucāns (born 1956), Latvian politician and mathematician

See also
Janis (disambiguation)
Jāņi

References 

Latvian masculine given names